Pride of Texas  is the first studio album by American metal band Texas Hippie Coalition. It was released on February 12, 2008.

Production 
The album was produced by David Prater, and was mastered by David Zycheck at Largemouth Recording Studio.

Composition 
"Clenched Fist", the second song on the album, is dedicated to guitarist Darrell "Dimebag" Abbott, who was a significant influence on the band.

Reception 
Mark Allen of Hardrock Haven called Pride of Texas the album that added Texas Hippie Coalition to the list of southern metal artists.  Cuttingedgerocks.com called the work an "attack of blasting guitar, thumping drums and mind-wearing bass coupled with muscle driven intoxicated lyrics from a gargantuan with fitting gumpture and vocals".

Track listing

Personnel 
 John Exall – bass
 Randy Cooper – guitars
 Big Dad Ritch – lead vocals
 Michael Hayes – guitars
 Scott "Cowboy" Lytle – drums

References 

2008 debut albums
Texas Hippie Coalition albums